Melton Constable Hall is a large (Grade I listed) country house in the parish of Melton Constable, Norfolk, England designed in the Christopher Wren style and built between 1664 and 1670 for the Astley family who owned the estate from 1235 until 1948. The core of the house is Elizabethan.

Hall 

Melton Constable Hall is regarded as the finest specimen of the Christopher Wren style of house. The house was re-modelled and extended by Sir Jacob Astley between 1664 and 1670, replacing an earlier house dating from c.1500. It has some fine plaster ceilings dated 1687, probably fashioned by Edward Goudge.

The house is constructed of brick with slate and copper roofs. The main range has a nine bay frontage, with 7-bay extensions to the east and north. The main range is Grade I listed  and the north wing Grade II* listed. The stable buildings are variously Grade II and Grade II* listed.

Park 

Melton Constable Park was designed by Capability Brown in 1764–69; it has a church, a temple and various artistic follies. The church, St Peter's, which is small and unusual, nestles under trees (yews, firs and oaks) and can be reached by a drive lined with rhododendrons. It contains Norman work and many memorials to the Astley family who bear the title Lord Hastings. Sir Jacob Astley fought in the English Civil War and his prayer is still quoted by many: "Lord, I shall be very busy this day. I may forget Thee but do Thou not forget me".

North of the church and the hall there stands a tower known as Belle Vue, which has a view of Norwich and the sea. It was originally a smock-mill that was built by Sir Jacob Astley, 1st Baronet, of Melton Constable Hall in 1721. The mill was not much used. Sir Edward Astley, the 4th Baronet, replaced the wooden tower with a brick one c. 1775. The new tower was built over the existing three-storey brick, octagonal base; it is the only one of its type in the county and is the oldest base in the county. It fell into dereliction and remains on the English Heritage at Risk register, as do a number of outbuildings on the estate. Belle Vue tower is now a private home.

History
The manor of Melton Constable was given by William I to the Bishop of Thetford and occupied by his Constable, who had assumed the name of Melton with the suffix of Constable. It then passed to the Astley family and descended in the male line of that family from 1235 until sold by Lord Hastings in 1948 to the Duke of Westminster. It was then sold again in the 1950s and the land used for agricultural purposes, with the house being allowed to deteriorate.  In 1985, under the threat of a compulsory purchase order, the owner was obliged to sell on the Hall and parts of the estate.

The village of Seaton Sluice in Northumberland has public houses called The Astley Arms and The Melton Constable, a legacy of a marriage in Georgian times which united the Astley family with the Delaval family of the nearby Seaton Delaval Hall.

The award-winning film The Go Between was filmed at Melton Constable Hall.

The 1985 Al Pacino film 'Revolution' also used Melton Constable Hall as one of its locations.

Present situation
As of 2017, the property is owned by Roger Gawn.

Over the years some local people have been concerned about the state of the hall and its surrounding buildings. Parts of it are now very run-down. The following buildings were listed as At Risk as of April 2010 - Melton Constable Hall, Melton Constable Hall stable court west and north wings, Melton Constable Hall Terraces, The Bath House Melton Constable Park, and The Teahouse Melton Constable Park.

An article in the local newspaper, the Eastern Daily Press, had some details of the condition it is in and gave information about the business dealings of the owner.

References

Country houses in Norfolk
Melton Constable Hall
Melton Constable Hall North Wing
1670 establishments in England